An external ray is a curve that runs from infinity toward a Julia or Mandelbrot set.
Although this curve is only rarely a half-line (ray) it is called a ray because it is an image of a ray.

External rays are used in complex analysis, particularly in complex dynamics and geometric function theory.

History
External rays were introduced in Douady and Hubbard's study of the Mandelbrot set

Types
Criteria for classification :
 plane : parameter or dynamic
 map
 bifurcation of dynamic rays
 Stretching
 landing

plane 
External rays of (connected) Julia sets on dynamical plane are often called dynamic rays.

External rays of the Mandelbrot set (and similar one-dimensional connectedness loci) on parameter plane  are called parameter rays.

bifurcation
Dynamic ray can be:
 bifurcated = branched  = broken   
 smooth = unbranched =  unbroken

When the filled Julia set is connected, there are no branching external rays. When the Julia set is not connected then some external rays branch.

stretching
Stretching rays were introduced by Branner and Hubbard:

"The notion of stretching rays is a generalization of that of external rays for the Mandelbrot set to higher degree polynomials."

landing

Every rational parameter ray of the Mandelbrot set lands at a single parameter.

Maps

Polynomials

Dynamical plane = z-plane 
External rays are associated to a compact, full, connected subset  of the complex plane as :
 the images of radial rays under the Riemann map of the complement of 
 the gradient lines of the Green's function of 
 field lines of Douady-Hubbard potential
 an integral curve of the gradient vector field of the Green's function on neighborhood of infinity

In other words the external rays define vertical foliation which is orthogonal to horizontal foliation defined by the level sets of potential.

Uniformization
Let  be the conformal isomorphism from the complement (exterior) of the closed unit disk   to the complement of the filled Julia set  .

where  denotes the extended complex plane.
Let  denote the Boettcher map.

and 

A value  is called the Boettcher coordinate for a point .

Formal definition of dynamic ray

The external ray of angle   noted as is:
 the image under  of straight lines 

set of points of exterior of filled-in Julia set with the same external angle

Properties

The external ray for a periodic angle  satisfies:

and its landing point  satisfies:

Parameter plane = c-plane 
"Parameter rays are simply the curves that run perpendicular to the equipotential curves of the M-set."

Uniformization

Let  be the mapping from the complement (exterior) of the closed unit disk   to the complement of the Mandelbrot set  .

and Boettcher map (function) , which is uniformizing map of complement of Mandelbrot set, because it conjugates complement of the Mandelbrot set   and the complement (exterior) of the closed unit disk

it can be normalized so that :

where :
 denotes the extended complex plane

Jungreis function  is the inverse of uniformizing map :

In the case of complex quadratic polynomial one can compute this map using Laurent series about infinity

where

Formal definition of parameter ray

The external ray of angle  is:
the image under  of straight lines 

set of points of exterior of Mandelbrot set with the same external angle

Definition of 

Douady and Hubbard define:

so external angle of point  of parameter plane is equal to external angle of point  of dynamical plane

External angle

Angle  is named external angle ( argument ).

Principal value of external angles are measured in turns modulo 1

1  turn = 360 degrees = 2 ×  radians

Compare different types of angles :
 external ( point of set's exterior )
 internal ( point of component's interior  )
 plain ( argument of complex number )

Computation of external argument
  argument of Böttcher coordinate as an external argument
 
 
 kneading sequence as a binary expansion of external argument

Transcendental maps

For transcendental maps ( for example exponential ) infinity is not a fixed point but an  essential singularity and there is no Boettcher isomorphism.

Here dynamic ray is defined as a curve :
 connecting a point in an escaping set and infinity 
 lying in an escaping set

Images

Dynamic rays

Parameter rays

Mandelbrot set for complex quadratic polynomial with parameter rays of root points

Parameter space of the complex exponential family f(z)=exp(z)+c. Eight parameter rays landing at this parameter are drawn in black.

Programs that can draw external rays
Mandel  - program by Wolf Jung written in C++  using Qt  with source code available under the GNU General Public License
Java applets by Evgeny Demidov ( code of mndlbrot::turn function by Wolf Jung has been ported to Java ) with free source code
 ezfract by Michael Sargent, uses the code by Wolf Jung
OTIS  by Tomoki KAWAHIRA  - Java applet  without source code
Spider XView program by Yuval Fisher 
YABMP by Prof. Eugene Zaustinsky for DOS without source code
DH_Drawer by Arnaud Chéritat written for Windows 95 without source code
Linas Vepstas C programs   for Linux console with source code
Program Julia by Curtis T. McMullen written in C and Linux commands for C shell console  with source code
mjwinq program by Matjaz Erat  written in delphi/windows without source code ( For the external rays it uses the methods from quad.c in julia.tar by  Curtis T McMullen)
RatioField by Gert Buschmann, for windows with Pascal source code for Dev-Pascal 1.9.2 (with  Free Pascal compiler )
Mandelbrot program by Milan Va, written in Delphi with source code
 Power MANDELZOOM by Robert Munafo
 ruff by Claude Heiland-Allen

See also

external rays of Misiurewicz point
Orbit portrait
Periodic points of complex quadratic mappings
Prouhet-Thue-Morse constant
Carathéodory's theorem
Field lines of Julia sets

References

Lennart Carleson and Theodore W. Gamelin, Complex Dynamics, Springer 1993
Adrien Douady and John H. Hubbard, Etude dynamique des polynômes complexes, Prépublications mathémathiques d'Orsay 2/4 (1984 / 1985)
John W. Milnor, Periodic Orbits, External Rays and the Mandelbrot Set: An Expository Account; Géométrie complexe et systèmes dynamiques (Orsay, 1995), Astérisque No. 261 (2000), 277–333. (First appeared as a Stony Brook IMS Preprint in 1999, available as arXiV:math.DS/9905169.)
 John Milnor, Dynamics in One Complex Variable, Third Edition, Princeton University Press, 2006, 
    Wolf Jung : Homeomorphisms on Edges of the Mandelbrot Set. Ph.D. thesis of 2002

External links

Hubbard Douady Potential, Field Lines by Inigo Quilez 
Intertwined Internal Rays in Julia Sets of Rational Maps by Robert L. Devaney
Extending External Rays Throughout the Julia Sets of Rational Maps by Robert L. Devaney With Figen Cilingir and Elizabeth D. Russell
John Hubbard's presentation, The Beauty and Complexity of the Mandelbrot Set, part 3.1  
videos by ImpoliteFruit

Complex numbers
Fractals
Polynomials
Articles containing video clips